The article presents the discography of American folk music singer-songwriter Tracy Chapman. She has released eight studio albums, two greatest hits albums, and 22 singles on Elektra Records. She has four Platinum albums, two of which are multi-platinum, and two Gold albums. Her smash hits "Fast Car" and "Give Me One Reason" both hit the Top 10 on the Billboard Hot 100 charts, peaking at No. 6 and No. 3, respectively. Both singles hit No. 1 in Canada.

Albums

Studio albums

Compilation albums

Singles

As lead artist

Other appearances

Contributions
Duet songs:
1997: "The Thrill Is Gone" with B.B. King from his album Deuces Wild
1999: "Give Me One Reason" with Eric Clapton from the album A Very Special Christmas Live
1999: "Trench Town Rock" with Stephen and Ziggy Marley at the One Love The Bob Marley All-Star Tribute
2000: "Baby Can I Hold You" with Luciano Pavarotti from the DVD/Album Pavarotti and Friends for Cambodia and Tibet
2001: "The Maker" with Dave Matthews on October 21, 2001, at the Bridge School Benefit
2005: "Ain't No Sunshine" with Buddy Guy from his album Bring 'Em In

Covered songs:
 1990: "The House of the Rising Sun" – Rubáiyát (LP)
 1993: "The Times They Are A Changin" – Bob Dylan 30th Anniversary Celebration (LP)
 1997 and 1999: "O Holy Night" – A Very Special Christmas 3 (LP) and A Very Special Christmas Live (LP)
 2000: "Three Little Birds" – Live at the One Love The Bob Marley All-Star Tribute
 2003: "Get Up Stand Up" – by Bob Marley featured on the Let It Rain tour edition (CD2 & LP)
 2005: "Stand By Me" – by Ben E. King on the XM Hear Music Radio Sessions Volume 1 (LP)

Music videos

Notes

References

External links
 
 
 
 Atlantic Records page
 "A Better Chance" education program for minority students

Discography
Folk music discographies
Discographies of American artists